Sneha Ullal (born 18 December 1987) is an Indian actress who has appeared in Telugu and Hindi films. She is known for her roles in the Telugu films Ullasamga Utsahamga, Simha and the Hindi film Lucky: No Time for Love.

Early life
Sneha Ullal was born bought up in Middle East in Muscat, Oman to a Tulu Devadiga father from Mangalore and a Sindhi mother. She studied at Indian School Wadi Kabir and Indian School, Salalah in Oman. Later she moved to Mumbai with her mother and attended Durelo Convent High School and studied at Vartak College.

Career
Ullal made her movie debut in the 2005 Hindi movie Lucky: No Time for Love opposite Salman Khan. After the movie, she was noted for her striking similarities in appearance with Aishwarya Rai. She later said that although the comparison didn't help her as an actor, it gave her a lot of recognition. Ullal then appeared with Khan's brother Sohail Khan in Aryan, which did not do well at the box office.

Fearing that she was too young and needed to be more mature to work in movies, she took a break from Bollywood. She made her debut in Telugu movies with Ullasamga Utsahamga, which turned out to be a huge hit. Nenu Meeku Telusa...? was her second Telugu release. It was followed by an appearance in the song Nuvvu ready in the Telugu movie King opposite Nagarjuna.

In 2007, she was to appear in Pirate's Blood by prolific horror filmmaker and character actor Steg Dorr. In interviews, Dorr would say "we canceled them because of a hurricane. We could not get it going on and the financing fell through." The role later went to Oman actress Maimoon Al-Balushi.

Later, she signed Kaashh... Mere Hote to show that she is still interested in Hindi films. Her next few films didn't do well at the box office, but her 2010 release Simha opposite Balakrishna turned out to be a blockbuster.

Filmography

Films

Web series

References

External links 

  
 

1987 births
Living people
People from Muscat, Oman
Actresses from Mumbai
Indian film actresses
Indian web series actresses
Indian expatriates in Oman
Mangaloreans
Tulu people
Sindhi people
Actresses in Hindi cinema
Actresses in Telugu cinema
Actresses in Kannada cinema
Actresses in Bengali cinema
21st-century Indian actresses